Jefferson County Public Schools can refer to a U.S. public school system in several states, including:

Jefferson County Board of Education (Alabama)
Jefferson County Public Schools (Colorado)
Jefferson County Schools (Florida)
Jefferson County Public Schools (Kentucky)
Jefferson County Public Schools (Tennessee)
Jefferson County Public Schools (West Virginia)

See also
Jefferson County Board of Education (disambiguation)
Jefferson School District (disambiguation)